Lenzie Academy is a co-educational comprehensive secondary school located in Lenzie, East Dunbartonshire, Scotland. The catchment area covers Lenzie, Auchinloch and southern parts of Kirkintilloch.

Senior management team
The school is managed by the senior management team, composed of the Head Teacher and six Deputy Head Teachers, each in charge of a year group. In 2011–present the headteacher was Brian Paterson.

School roll
The most recently reported school roll is 1296, taught by a teaching staff of 101. The S1 intake cap is 240, based on an average annual first year intake of eight classes of approximately thirty pupils each, mostly coming from four associated primary schools, namely Auchinloch, Millersneuk, Lairdsland and Lenzie Meadow Primary. Approximately 40% of the total roll are from outside the catchment area, attending as placing requests. The S1 rolls have slightly reduced in recent years and in early 2012 the reported 2012/2013 intake was 226 pupils, consisting of 125 from the zoned area and 101 through placing requests. The total school roll has been falling every year for the last 8 years with the 2011/2012 figure being 25 pupils lower than the previous years 1321 pupils.

Table

Alcohol and drugs controversies
In October 1995, two 12-year-old boys were suspended for dealing with drugs. It followed a string of other drug-related incidents. In 1994, a 16-year-old was expelled for drug dealing, then re-admitted. Also that year, four pupils were suspended over claims of drug taking, and a 15-year-old boy was arrested outside school and charged with possessing cannabis." Eight pupils who smoked cannabis on a school trip to Alton Towers were suspended for a fortnight following a disciplinary hearing at the school in June 1998.

Black Lives Matter controversy
An investigation by East Dunbartonshire Council started on 4 June 2020 after Lenzie Academy's physics department account published a tweet which reportedly mocked the Take the Knee campaign. The campaign had taken off after the murder of George Floyd a week previously in the USA. The tweet, which has since been deleted along with the account itself, stated: "#TaketheKnee? Aye you can f*** right off". The council confirmed that they had reported the incident to the police. The local MP, Amy Callaghan, said that she had contacted the council and the school headmaster about the tweet, and that she had also heard from students of the school about their experience of racism.

Bullying and gang issues
The school has also received continuing attention for problems with gangs/bullying as well as knife crime.

In 2016, a boy aged 14 years old was reported to the police after a knife incident at the school.

The suicide of Nicola Ann Raphael, a pupil at Lenzie Academy, in 2001 was heavily covered in local and national press and came after Raphael had suffered years of bullying.

School buildings
The current red brick Academy building was built in 1960 and extensions have been added to it over the years.
 The original school building dating from when the Academy was founded in 1886 has since served as Lenzie Primary school.
More than 110 years after opening the school admitted its first physically disabled student in 1996 which meant the school had to install a lift and ramps to make the whole building accessible.

Head teachers
There have been ten head teachers of Lenzie Academy. For 125 years until 2011, the head teacher was referred to as Rector.

Notable people educated at Lenzie Academy

 Moira Anderson (born 1938), Singer
 Sir Andrew Baker (born 1965), High Court judge
 Martin Creed (born 1968), Turner Prize-winning artist
 Rona Dougall, Scotland Tonight presenter, broadcast journalist
 Jane Duncan (1910–1976), Author (known by her legal name of Elizabeth Jane Cameron while a pupil)
 Andy Dunlop (born 1972), Travis guitarist
Alasdair Graham (pianist) (1934–2016), Scottish concert pianist.
 Andrew Henderson (born 1980), Scottish rugby union footballer.
Tom Johnston (politician) (1882–1965), Secretary of State for Scotland during the Second World War in Churchill's cabinet
 Jimmy Mack (1934–2004), broadcaster
 Gus MacPherson (born 1968), footballer.
 Ian McCartney (born 1951), former MP, chairman of the Labour Party and member of Tony Blair's cabinet He left the school at the age of 15 "under a bit of a cloud" without any qualifications or school prizes.
 Rhona McLeod (born 1966), news reader.
 Nicola Raphael (1985–2001) – A pupil whose suicide and preceding bullying at the school led to press coverage and later legal action.
Melissa Reid Attempted cocaine smuggler
 Michael Shea (diplomat) (1938–2009), Press Secretary to Queen Elizabeth II (1978–1987) He left the Academy after winning a scholarship to Gordonstoun at the age of 14.
 Billy Williamson (1922–2006), footballer, later a PE teacher at the school.

Academic rankings
In 2014 the school was ranked 13.th in STV's league table of Scottish state schools.
This builds upon the 19th position achieved in 2013 and the 16th position achieved in 2012 based on the percentage of pupils obtaining 5 or more Highers at bands A-C.

See also
List of places in East Dunbartonshire
List of places in Scotland
:Category:People educated at Lenzie Academy

References

External links
Lenzie Academy Website
Lenzie Academy's page on Scottish Schools Online

Secondary schools in East Dunbartonshire
Educational institutions established in 1886
School buildings completed in 1960
Lenzie
Kirkintilloch
1886 establishments in Scotland